Joel Sill is a music supervisor, music producer and consultant known for his work on Forrest Gump, Cast Away and Terminator 3: Rise of the Machines, The Goonies, Blade Runner, The Color Purple, and My Cousin Vinny.

Biography

Joel Sill was born in Santa Monica, California in 1946 to Lester Sill, a record label executive, and his wife Harriet, along with his brothers Greg Sill and Lonnie Sill, both music supervisors. He also had a half brother, Chuck Kaye, a music publishing executive. Sill graduated in 1964 from Grant High School, and received an AA from Pierce College in 1974.

Sill's wife, Kimberly Sill, started and runs Shelter Hope Pet Shop, a humane pet shop. She has adopted over 10,000 dogs to new homes. She also directed the documentary Saved in America, co-produced with Sill.

Career
Sill's first job in the music industry was for The Big Three Music Publishing Company aka Robbins, Feist and Miller which he joined in 1967. From 1968 to 1969, Sill worked for Irving Almo Music (A&M Records publishing company) and in 1969 went on to work for Dunhill Records producing his first soundtrack for the film Easy Rider. In 1972, Sill was hired by Clive Davis of Columbia Records as a producer. In 1975, Sill returned to work for Irving Almo Music where he stayed until he was offered a position at Paramount Pictures in 1980 as the Vice President of Music, overseeing and designing music for films including An Officer and a Gentleman and Flashdance. Theme songs from both films - "Up Where We Belong" and "Flashdance... What a Feeling" went on to win Academy Awards for Best Original Song.
 
In 1984, Sill became Vice President of Music for Warner Bros Films for all filmed entertainment. At Warner's, Sill oversaw the music for films such as Mad Max Beyond Thunderdome,The Killing Fields, Blade Runner, Purple Rain, The Color Purple, and first introduced Madonna's music to film in Vision Quest with Crazy for You. In 1987, Sill partnered with director Taylor Hackford in the New Visions Music Group, where he supervised music for Mannequin, which included a #1 hit with "Nothing’s Gonna Stop Us Now" as well as La Bamba, which produced the #1 single “La Bamba", the 5x multi-platinum soundtrack album by Los Lobos.

In 1989, and for the next 10 years, Sill partnered with his half brother, Chuck Kaye, who was previously the Chairman of Warner Chappell Music, to form Windswept Pacific a joint venture with Pacific Music of Fuji Sankei Communications. They purchased the Big 7 music publishing catalog from Morris Levy which included the music from over 100 gold records. During this time, Sill supervised the music for The Fabulous Baker Boys,The Firm, Twister, Forrest Gump (8 x multiplatinum), Terminator 3: Rise of the Machines, Contact, Castaway and Munich.

In 2002, Nigel Sinclair hired Sill and Bill Curbishley, former manager of The Who and Jimi Hendrix to start Intermedia Films Music 
Group. They had offices in Los Angeles and London and produced the soundtracks for K19: The Widowmaker, Adaptation, and Mariah Carey's Wise Girls. From 2004 to 2012, Sill formed a joint venture with Cherry Lane/BMG Music. Cherry Lane was founded in 1960 by renowned producer/arranger Milt Okun, who oversaw an extensive catalog of songs from Elvis Presley, John Denver, Quincy Jones and Ashford & Simpson, Black Eyed Peas and John Legend.

During the mid-70's Sill became a published underwater photographer represented by Jacques Cousteau’s Living Sea Corporation. He remains an active scuba diver, photographer, and advocate for the oceans. Currently he is working as an Ambassador for AltaSea, an ocean preservation and education non-profit in San Pedro, California.

Awards and nominations
2019 Legacy Award - Winner - The Guild of Music Supervisors Awards
1992 Film Independent Spirit Award - Nominee - Best Film Music - Hangin' with the Homeboys

Selected works

2019 - Dave Grusin: Not Enough Time (documentary) - co-producer
2018 - Mabel, Mabel, Tiger Trainer (documentary) - executive music producer
2017 - Shot - music supervisor
2016 - The Complete Singles: 50th Anniversary Collection - The Mamas & the Papas - producer
2016 - Live Another Day (documentary) - executive music producer
2015 - Saved in America (documentary short) - music supervisor, co-producer
2014 - A Group Called Smith/Minus-Plus" - Smith - producer
2014 - Begin Again - music consultant
2013 - New Blood/No Sweat/More Than Ever - Blood - producer
2013 - So Undercover - music consultant
2012 - Bound by Flesh (documentary) - executive music producer
2012 - Smitty - executive music producer
2012 - The Woman in Black - music consultant 
2010 - Let Me In(original Score) - music Consultant
2010 - Love Ranch- executive music producer
2010 - Behind the Burly Q - (documentary) - executive music producer
2009 - Possession - music consultant
2008 - Space Chimps - music supervisor
2006 - Bobby - music supervisor, soundtrack producer
2005 - Early Steppenwolf/For Ladies Only - Steppenwolf - re-recording supervisor
2005 - Complete Anthology - The Mamas & the Papas - producer
2005 - Munich - music consultant
2005 - Enfants Terribles - music supervisor
2005 - Mindhunters - music supervisor
2004 - Home and Away: The Complete Recordings 1960-1970 - Del Shannon - producer
2004 - Alexander - (original motion picture soundtrack) - music executive
2004 - Suspect Zero - executive music producer
2003 - Terminator 3: Rise of the Machines - executive producer, executive music producer
2003 - Basic - executive music producer
2003 - Masked and Anonymous - Bob Dylan - executive music producer
2002 - Dark Blue - executive music producer
2002 - Showtime - music supervisor
2002 - K-19: The Widowmaker - (original motion picture score) - executive music producer
2002 - David Clayton-Thomas/Tequila Sunrise - David Clayton-Thomas - producer
2001 - The Singles+ - The Mamas & the Papas - producer
2001 - Bandits - executive music producer
2000 - Cast Away - music consultant
2000 - The Adventures of Rocky & Bullwinkle - executive music producer
2000 - Return to Me - executive music producer
2000 - What Lies Beneath - music consultant
2000 - Liberty Heights - (original soundtrack) - music supervisor
2000 - Flawless- (original soundtrack) - executive music producer
1999 - Robert Zemeckis on Smoking, Drinking and Drugging in the 20th Century: In Pursuit of Happiness - (TV Movie documentary) - music supervisor
1998 - Dance with Me - executive music producer
1997 - Wag the Dog - music consultant: Tribeca
1997 - Contact - song wrangler
1997 - Speed 2: Cruise Control - music consultant
1996 - Striptease - executive music producer
1996 - Twister - Original Score - music supervisor
1995 - Something to Talk About - music consultant
1995 - Free Willy 2: The Adventure Home - music consultant
1994 - Forrest Gump - executive music producer, soundtrack executive producer
1994 - The Endless Summer ll - (documentary) - executive music producer
1994 - Lightning Jack - music consultant
1993 - Free Willy - music consultant
1993 - Flesh and Bone - music consultant
1993 - The Firm - (original motion picture soundtrack) - music consultant
1992 - My Cousin Vinny - music consultant
1991 - Hangin' with the Homeboys - executive music producer
1991 - For the Boys - Bette Midler - executive music producer
1990 - White Palace - executive music producer
1990 - Coupe de Ville - executive music producer
1990 - Rock Artifacts, Vol. 1 - Sweathog - producer
1990 - Greatest Hits [Rhino] - Del Shannon - producer
1989 - The Fabulous Baker Boys - executive music producer
1989 - Music, My Love - Jean-Pierre Rampal - producer
1989 - Licence to Kill - executive soundtrack producer, music consultant
1989 - Rooftops - executive music producer
1989 - Tap - executive music producer
1988 - Everybody's All-American - music supervisor
1988 - Bright Lights, Big City - executive music producer
1987 - Mannequin - music supervisor
1987 - Overboard - music consultant
1987 - La Bamba - executive music producer
1986 - First and Goal (Wildcats) - music supervisor
1986 - 'Round Midnight - music supervisor
1986 - Club Paradise - music supervisor

1986 - Little Shop of Horrors - executive in charge of music
1986 - The Clan of the Cave Bear - executive in charge of music
1985 - The Color Purple - executive in charge of music
1985 - Vision Quest- executive in charge of music
1985 - The Goonies - executive in charge of music
1985 - Follow That Bird - Sesame Street - executive music producer
1985 - American Flyers - executive in charge of music
1985 - Krush Groove - executive in charge of music
1985 - Spies Like Us - executive in charge of music
1985 - Revolution - executive in charge of music
1985 - Mishima: A Life in Four Chapters - executive in charge of music
1985 - Seven Minutes in Heaven - executive in charge of music
1985 - Pee-Wee's Big Adventure - executive in charge of music
1985 - National Lampoon's European Vacation - executive in charge of music
1985 - Mad Max Beyond Thunderdome - executive in charge of music
1985 - Police Academy 2: Their First Assignment - executive in charge of music
1985 - Ladyhawke - executive in charge of music
1985 - Lost in America - executive in charge of music
1985 - Fandango - executive in charge of music
1984 - The Neverending Story - executive in charge of music
1984 - Protocol - executive in charge of music
1984 - Oh, God! You Devil - executive in charge of music
1984 - The Little Drummer Girl - executive in charge of music
1984 - Irreconcilable Differences - executive in charge of music
1984 - The Killing Fields - executive in charge of music
1984 - Gremlins - executive in charge of music
1984 - Finders Keepers - executive in charge of music
1984 - Purple Rain - executive in charge of music
1984 - Lassiter - executive in charge of music
1984 - Swing Shift - executive in charge of music
1984 - Greystoke: The Legend of Tarzan, Lord of the Apes - executive in charge of music
1984 - Police Academy - executive in charge of music
1984 - Footloose - executive in charge of music
1983 - Trading Places - executive in charge of music
1983 - Deal of the Century - executive in charge of music
1983 - Terms of Endearment - executive in charge of music
1983 - Staying Alive - executive in charge of music
1983 - Baby It's You - executive in charge of music
1983 - Flashdance - Original source score - executive in charge of music
1983 - The Lords of Discipline - executive in charge of music
1983 - The Keep - executive in charge of music
1983 - Testament - music supervisor
1982 - 48 hours - executive in charge of music
1982 - White Dog - executive in charge of music
1982 - An Officer and a Gentleman - executive in charge of music 
1982 - Star Trek II: The Wrath of Khan - executive in charge of music
1982 - Some Kind of Hero - executive in charge of music
1982 - Deadly Games - executive in charge of music
1982 - I'm Dancing as Fast as I Can - executive in charge of music
1981 - Raiders of the Lost Ark - executive in charge of music
1981 - Paternity - executive in charge of music
1981 - Mommie Dearest - executive in charge of music
1981 - Dragon Slayer - executive in charge of music
1981 - Reds - executive in charge of music
1980 - Animalympics - music supervisor
1979 - Steel - music supervisor
1979 - Hart to Hart - (TV Series) - music consultant
1979 - J-Men Forever - recorded score producer
1978 - The Big Fix - music supervisor
1977 - First Love - music supervisor: soundtrack/musical director
1976 - Mother, Jugs & Speed - music score producer
1976 - Tropea - John Tropea - cover photo
1975 - Katherine (TV Movie) - music score producer: Almo Music
1973 - Go Ask Alice (TV Movie) - music producer: Almo Productions
1972 - Fat City - music supervisor (uncredited)
1971 - The Last Picture Show - music consultant (uncredited)
1971 - Prairie Madness - Prairie Madness - producer
1970 - Flying Ahead - Atlee Yeager - producer
1970 - Lovers and Other Strangers - executive in charge of music (uncredited) 
1970 - Lancelot Link and the Evolution Revolution - Lancelot Link & The Evolution Revolution - producer
1969 - Sunshower - Thelma Houston - producer
1969 - Minus-Plus - Smith - producer
1969 - A Group Called Smith - Smith - producer, composer
1969 - Easy Rider - coordination and production
1964 - Kustom City U.S.A.'' - Kustom Kings - producer

References

1946 births
Living people
American record producers
American music industry executives